Sunspot (Roberto "Bobby" da Costa) is a fictional superhero appearing in American comic books published by Marvel Comics. The character is most commonly associated with X-Men-related groups the New Mutants and X-Force.

A mutant from Brazil, Sunspot possesses the ability to absorb and channel solar power. He is idealistic and impulsive, but is considered a close friend to many of his teammates. He is initially portrayed as an important member of the X-Men's 1980s-era junior team and its reincarnation X-Force. He later retires as Sunspot and garners a massive fortune that allows him to buy out the organization Advanced Idea Mechanics, which he re-brands to Avengers Idea Mechanics and he operates under the code name Citizen V.

Adan Canto portrays the character in X-Men: Days of Future Past. Henry Zaga portrays the character at a younger age, in The New Mutants.

Publication history

The character Sunspot was created by writer Chris Claremont and artist Bob McLeod. The hero first appeared in ''Marvel Graphic Novel: The New Mutants #4 (November 1982), as part of the line Marvel Graphic Novel. Immediately after, the character became part of the regular cast of The New Mutants, as part of the titular super group.

He was a member of the Avengers in the 2012 relaunch of the Avengers title.

Sunspot is one of the main characters in U.S.Avengers.

Fictional character biography

Origin
Sunspot, or Roberto da Costa, is a Pardo Brazilian, the son of wealthy Afro-Brazilian businessman Emmanuel da Costa and his white American mother archaeologist Nina da Costa. In The New Mutants #7, his father is described as a very driven man, who "grew up [...] a barefoot houseboy", "by age 20 [...] a millionaire [and] by 30, an economic and political force to be reckoned with." Emmanuel constantly pushes his son to reach for both his physical and intellectual limits. Thanks to his father's encouragement, Roberto rose to the position of star soccer player at school and was considered by recruiters for the Olympic Games.

When Roberto was playing a soccer game with his team, racist members of the opposing team assaulted him, and Roberto responded by initiating a fight on the field. While taking a brutal beating, his mutant powers manifested, suddenly transforming him into a creature of solid black solar energy. Surprised and terrified, people abandoned the stadium, and only his girlfriend Juliana stayed.

New Mutants

Within a matter of days, a mutant-hating faction led by the character Donald Pierce and employing Hellfire Club mercenaries kidnap Juliana, luring Roberto into a trap. He engages the kidnappers, but is eventually defeated when his power reserve runs out. Other mutants named Karma and Psyche rescue him. In the course of the following battle, Juliana sacrifices her life for Roberto, jumping in front of a bullet meant for him.

After the rescue, Roberto joins Karma and Psyche in pursuit of Donald Pierce. The three are joined by Wolfsbane, and after the battle by Sam Guthrie, a.k.a. Cannonball, one of Pierce's misguided mutant hirelings, despite initial reservations from the others. Professor X offers to train the five teenagers in controlling their nascent mutant powers, which they accept and become the founding members of the group known as the New Mutants, a group of junior X-Men. Although Professor Xavier's intentions are for them to only be students, over the course of the New Mutants ongoing series, they grow into superheroes, and they travel to such locations as space, Asgard, and the Amazon, as well as the past and the future. During his tenure with the New Mutants, he and Sam become best friends.

Sunspot was at one point injected with the drug that helped create Cloak and Dagger, and he briefly became a monster. Sunspot was later reunited with his parents, and then with the New Mutants he visited Nova Roma. He then encountered the White Queen and her Hellions for the first time. He was later abducted and forced to serve as one of the Gladiators. On another adventure with the New Mutants, he visited the land of Asgard. Alongside the New Mutants, he later fought Warlock's father, the Magus. He also battled Cameron Hodge and the Right. Alongside the New Mutants he battled Freedom Force. He also fell in love with the alien Gosamyr.

X-Force

When the time traveling antihero Cable takes over the New Mutants and turns them into the paramilitary group X-Force, Sunspot parts ways with the team. During this time Sunspot is tutored by Gideon of the Externals, an old business partner of Roberto's father (who has since died). Suspecting Sunspot to be a fellow External, he takes Sunspot under his wing. Gideon ends up experimenting on Sunspot, granting him new powers such as flight and the ability to fire blasts of solar energy. For a time, Sunspot becomes lost in a space-time continuum after interfering with the teleportation powers of Locus. During this time, a villain called Reignfire comes onto the scene, showing a remarkable similar appearance to Sunspot.

Reignfire

The villain Reignfire first appears  before Sunspot's mysterious disappearance in X-Force #28 (1993), when he assumes command of the Mutant Liberation Front. Dani Moonstar, who had infiltrated the MLF, sees Reignfire without his mask and believes him to be Sunspot, and in a battle with X-Force, Reignfire even removes his mask to reveal himself as Sunspot. The moment was interrupted by the Age of Apocalypse and when reality is restored, Cable 'heals' Sunspot of this persona dominating his body, transferring some of his Askani knowledge into Sunspot, allowing Sunspot to speak the Askani language and know of their meditation techniques. In an incident where X-Force reconnected with former teammate Skids, it is discovered that Reignfire is actually a protoplasmic mutant symbiote injected with Sunspot's blood. Reignfire is seemingly permanently defeated when Sunspot leeches him of his powers, reducing him to his original protoplasmic state which is then claimed by S.H.I.E.L.D.

X-Force Roadtrip
Roberto later joins the rest of X-Force on an extended road trip, separating themselves from Cable. Along the way, they meet several problems, including Roberto's money being tied up in litigation, forcing the team into doing a variety of odd jobs. One included providing protection for a small businessman being hassled by elements of the mob. During this time, Roberto has a short fling with Sam's girlfriend Tabitha Smith, a teammate.

Hellfire Club
Later during his X-Force career, Roberto is approached by Selene of the Hellfire Club. She offers Roberto his deceased father Emmanuel's seat in the Club's Inner Circle, as the seats are inherited. She promises Roberto that she will resurrect Juliana if he joins and he agrees. Selene keeps her part of the bargain, but only to a certain extent. She does bring back the spirit of Juliana, but inserts it into the body of a comatose girl. Possibly because he felt obliged to fulfill his promise, Roberto decides to stay, becoming Selene's Black Rook.  Roberto attempts to contact the resurrected Juliana, but seeing she has no memory of her previous life, he decides to leave her alone.

With no explanation given, Roberto next surfaces in the title X-Treme X-Men as the head of the Los Angeles branch of X-Corporation, along with former New Mutant Magma and former Hellion Empath. Roberto's ties to the Hellfire Club are not however severed, as Sebastian Shaw approaches, having taken over the position of Hellfire Club's Lord Imperial and wanting Roberto as his Black King. Shaw claims that he is trying to turn the Club into a force of good, so Roberto accepts, though he keeps his involvement with Shaw a secret.

Soon after, Shaw is injured in battle by Donald Pierce. His injuries make him incapable of overseeing the Hellfire Club. Roberto takes over as Lord Imperial. At his side is Sage who leaves the X-Men to make sure Roberto is not corrupted by the power he wields. After the events of M-Day, Cyclops calls for the shutting down of all branches of the X-Corporation to better pool the resources of the X-Men. In Endangered Species, Sebastian Shaw seems to be thinking of reclaiming his place and to be quite mad at Sunspot.

Secret Invasion
During the Secret Invasion storyline, Sunspot is among the several X-Men helping to fight off Skrulls during their invasion of San Francisco.

Young X-Men
Sunspot, who remains Lord Imperial of the Hellfire Club, is revealed by Cyclops to belong to the newest incarnation of the Brotherhood of Evil Mutants along with Danielle Moonstar, Cannonball, and Magma. However, while battling members of Cyclops' new team of X-Men alongside Cannonball, there is much confusion after Rockslide makes reference to the two mutants' membership in the Brotherhood. During the course of the battle, Sunspot is seriously wounded by Wolf Cub, who slashes Roberto's face and stomach with his claws. It is eventually revealed that "Cyclops" is in reality Donald Pierce, the former White King of the Hellfire Club, who is posing as the X-Men leader using an image inducer.  Pierce's reasons for recruiting these "X-Men" is currently unknown, but it appears that his primary focus is to eliminate the Lord Imperial and utilized the ruse that Sunspot and his allies formed a new Brotherhood to convince the former Xavier students to attack their former teachers and allies.

Later on, Sunspot leaves the Hellfire Club and joins the X-Men in San Francisco as noted by Sebastian Shaw who is currently looking for a replacement. Cyclops later asks Sunspot and Danielle Moonstar to help train the Young X-Men and both accepted.

Reforming the New Mutants
After receiving an anonymous tip in Colorado about a young mutant endangering a small town, Dani and Shan are sent to investigate and calm the locals. During their mission, Magik reappears back at the X-Men's base in San Francisco after teleporting off into the future after the events of "X-Infernus". Upon her return she informs Sam and Roberto that Shan and Dani are in trouble and it will result in their deaths. Sam assembles a team consisting of himself, Sunspot, Magma, and Magik to go find them. While searching for them, Sam and Roberto come across a tied up and comatose Shan in the back of a bar, while Magik and Magma are tricked into freeing Legion from a box, who apparently has Shan's personality imprisoned inside of him. Roberto and Sam approach Karma's body but when Roberto gets too close he almost gets pulled into Legion's mind. After they leave the bar, they find they're surrounded by police; Roberto and Sam fly away to the jail to find Dani.

When they arrive, Legion is trying to kill Dani. After Roberto and Sam repel him, Legion comes back and Sunspot fights him. Cannonball soon joins him and they fend him off and regroup. During the fight, Legion takes on Magma, Cannonball, and Roberto, who gets seriously injured when Legion slashes him with a shard of metal.

Avengers
After the events of Avengers vs. X-Men, Roberto and Sam are offered membership in the Avengers by Captain America and eagerly accept. The two become involved in a time travel plot involving the Next Avengers, children of the Avengers from an alternate future, but their memories of this are wiped by Maria Hill when they're done. 

During an eight month time-skip, Roberto engages in a hostile takeover of Advanced Idea Mechanics and gets rid of the villainous upper management. Roberto then uses the resources of A.I.M. to intervene in the conflict between the forces of S.H.I.E.L.D. and the Illuminati, while also sending a team of Avengers to deal with the multiversal threat of the Incursions.

New Avengers
After the events of Secret War, Roberto re-tools A.I.M. into Avengers Idea Mechanics, hiring various superheroes as a new Avengers team consisting of Hawkeye, Songbird, Squirrel Girl, Hulking, Wiccan, Power Man and White Tiger. S.H.I.E.L.D. sends two operatives, Dum Dum Dugan and Hawkeye to keep on eye on the team. Despite orders to spy on the new A.I.M., both men reveal their mission as they have come to respect Sunspot. His new team faces off against W.H.I.S.P.E.R., an organization run by the Maker, the Ultimate Universe's version of Reed Richards. The Maker's various plans cause trouble for the Avengers that bounces up and down the time stream. During the events of Avengers: Standoff, Roberto orders his Avengers team to free Rick Jones from S.H.I.E.L.D. custody. In response, the American government sends the American Kaiju to attack A.I.M. Island. Roberto, having seen such an attempt coming, has the island evacuated, and American Kaiju depowered by Avenger-5, a giant mecha suit.  As a result, Maria Hill decides to try and shut down A.I.M., at the same time the Maker launches his own attack. However, it transpires Roberto has also seen these attacks coming, aided by Songbird playing double agent, and manipulates both sides so that W.H.I.S.P.E.R. is destroyed and the Maker imprisoned. It is also revealed that Roberto has become exposed to a cloud of terrigen mist, which is toxic to Mutants, and every use of his powers now accelerates Roberto's aging. With the Maker captured, Roberto strikes a deal with the US government to round up the remaining rogue branches of A.I.M..  The operation is successful. In the middle of this, Roberto presents Wiccan and Hulkling with a parting gift of an expensive apartment.

U.S.Avengers
Following the deal that would get the Avengers Idea Mechanics to merge with the U.S. government as the American Intelligence Mechanics, Sunspot began to lead the U.S.Avengers under the alias of Citizen V. Their first mission takes place at the Secret Empire's floating volcanic island base. Red Hulk crash-landed into the floating volcanic island base, hard enough to destroy it. They're later approached by a future version of Danielle Cage as Captain America, who tells them that her nemesis, the Golden Skull, came to their timeline to steal all the wealth. In Miami, Florida, the team crash a charity gala only to discover that the wealthy CEO's were kidnapped and replaced by robots. During the battle, the team manages to defeat and capture the Golden Skull, who was wearing a golden armored suit. Danielle then goes back to her timeline with the Golden Skull as her prisoner. Sunspot then sends Red Hulk to confront and defeat an out-of-control American Kaiju, who was attacking Europe.

During the "Opening Salvo" part of the Secret Empire storyline, Captain America, whose memory was altered by Red Skull's clone using the powers of Kobik, has a meeting with Roberto da Costa and tells him that he is no longer in charge of the team. Roberto then sees footage of the supervillain attacks in Manhattan, deep space, and in Europe. At the beginning of the takeover, Roberto assembles the team until he is attacked by one of his scientists who has allied with Hydra. He's later seen in a prison cell, nearly dead, by Red Hulk and Toni Ho. While adjusting to prison life, Toni manages to heal Roberto just in time when Hydra soldiers show up at their cell. Roberto then manages to use his powers to defeat the guards and free Red Hulk from the nanites controlling him, allowing them to take control of the prison. In the aftermath of the event, Roberto, during a meeting with the team's new congressional liaison in the White House, resigns from his position despite the objections from the senator. He then meets Izzy Kane, Cannonball's wife, who tells him that Cannonball, who went missing in action during the takeover and was presumed dead, is still alive on another planet.

While travelling through space, Smasher and the U.S.Avengers are attacked by space pirates known as warpjackers. After a brief fight, the pirates tell them that Glenbrook is actually a planet named Kral X and that its ruler, Ritchie Redwood, is ruthless. Arriving on Kral X, the heroes manage to help Cannonball and the planet's rebels in overthrowing Ritchie. After restoring order to the planet, the heroes head home.

On return to Earth, Roberto redubs himself Citizen X. He assists Agent Jimmy Woo with his investigations into the mysterious Eternity Mask.

War of the Realms
After the Age of X-Man removes most X-Men members to an alternate reality, Sunspot reappears to assist Mirage and the remaining X-Men in repelling Malekith's invasion of Midgard. In a ploy to allow Magik to teleport the invading horde to Limbo, he breaks a cursed amulet blocking her powers, and in doing so, is vaporized, joining the fallen Valkyries in their journey to the afterlife.

Dawn of X
Roberto is resurrected on the newly established Mutant nation of Krakoa. While enjoying the new paradise, Roberto decides to invite Cannonball, still living in Shi'ar space, to join them, and talks several of the New Mutants into accompanying him.

Later, at the Hellfire Gala, Sunspot, disappointed for not been chosen to join the prestigious X-Men team, decided after a few drink with his drinking mates to create a new, secret team!

Sunspot is later contacted by Lady Deathbird about a threat to Empress Xandra’s life. Sunspot has been bragging that he is the leader of the X-Men and the Empress needs their help. Sunspot tells Cannonball that he wants to create a team and already has people lined up: Sunspot himself, Cannonball, Banshee, Boom-Boom, Armor, Tempo, Marrow and Strong Guy. After this new team and Forge agree to accept the mission, Sunspot reveals that it is for The Shi'ar Empress. Sunspot and Cannonball meet with Gladiator. Gladiator revealed many people have betrayed the Empress because she is considered too young to lead. They also tell the team that Deathbird and the Empress are missing. Sunspot leads his team into space, and Forge makes them matching outfits. But during their travels, they are attacked by Sidri bounty hunters, but Banshee repels them. Forge creates an algorithm to find Deathbird’s ship. Using Tempo’s powers, they can run the program thousands of times in only a few minutes. After a weird psychic puzzle, the group arrives on a planet and meets with the Empress, Deathbird, and two advisors. After a brief talk, the group is under attack, and Deathbird is hit with a teleport mine. Sunspot, who is upset that his target was hurt, uses his ability to destroy the ship of his assailants. As the Secret X-Men leaves, the Empress erases their memory of Deathbird’s disappearance.

Powers and abilities

Sunspot is a mutant whose cells have the ability to absorb solar energy and convert it for use as physical strength. He is also able to create thermal updrafts for flight, project heat and light, as well as concussive blasts of solar energy. At will, he is able to take on a superhuman "powered up" form that is entirely nonreflective black, save for his eyes and teeth which turn a solid bright white. Though the color black optimizes solar absorption, he absorbs solar power at all times, not only when he is in his "powered up" form. If he has not absorbed sufficient amounts of solar energy in normal form, he will be too weak to "power up". Likewise, when not in direct sunlight, use of his superhuman strength rapidly exhausts the stores of energy within his body.

When in his solar form, Sunspot also has a corona effect, an aura that has been depicted in multiple ways, though two predominant conventions exist for its portrayal: one is that the air close to him manifests black globes of various sizes, reminiscent of Kirby dots, and the other is a unified field glowing a bright yellow or white. Although Sunspot can absorb energy from stars and reflected solar energy from the moon, the amounts that reach him on Earth are too minuscule to add significantly to his power. In other regions, such as Asgard, his power is significantly enhanced, allowing him - with much effort - to lift Volstagg off the ground for a few seconds before suffering a backache.

Originally, Sunspot's superhuman power was limited solely to superhuman strength and enhanced durability, and then only in his solar form. Unlike many superhumanly strong heroes, Sunspot was unique in that his physical resistance to impact only increased somewhat when he employed his superhuman strength, and he was not bulletproof by any means. The phrase, "Careful Bobby, you're strong, not invulnerable!" or variations was seen many times. In addition, Sunspot's powers have radically changed and grown since the character was introduced; he can now withstand the force of a speeding eighteen-wheeler traveling at speeds of 100 mph, alongside surviving an A.I.M explosive charge latched onto his side.

Sunspot maintained his original powerset for roughly the first ten years of his existence, remaining a super strong but vulnerable individual throughout the entire New Mutants series. During the mid-1990s in X-Force his powers began to change, under writer Fabian Nicieza. Nicieza had the supervillain Gideon capture Roberto and subject him to experimentation where the limits of Roberto's power absorption were tested by feeding him immense amounts of solar power. Roberto was rescued by X-Force, but the overload had permanently altered his powers in such a way that he was now able to release concussive blasts of solar energy, with a considerable heat and light projection component; this experimentation also made him immune to all types of heat and fire. He can also now absorb other forms of energy; such as heat, light or even radiation in a manner similar to photo/radio- or thermokinesis. It was believed they do not power up his abilities but this was proven false. Sunspot also has some capacity to manipulate light based energy effects, but it remains a largely unexplored portent of his mutant power. It has been debated that Roberto would have reached these levels of his abilities of his own accord, and that Gideon's experimentation only increased his evolution process.

The fact that the solar blasts were concussive in origin led directly into X-Force #28, where Sunspot thinks of using them as a means of propulsion, and thus fly by blasting in the opposite direction of where he wanted to go – initially leaving a slight trail behind him, but in later years, Roberto would learn to use the propulsion more subtly – to appear to hover in place with no blast wake at all other than his usual "powered up" corona effect. His capacity to fly has similarly been enhanced as he is able to breach planetary orbit and reach Saturn's belt with relative ease.

Sunspot also had the rituals and ideas of the Askani inside his head, due to a telepathic contact with Cable. While being strongly influenced by it for a while, the memories seem to have faded.

Significant non-superhuman abilities include business administration, as he owns and runs a multibillion-dollar international conglomerate. He is an Olympic-class athlete as the result of having been trained in combat by the X-Men and later by Cable. He is an expert in many languages (see below) and has an assortment of other more minor talents such as piloting aircraft. He was trained in swordsmanship by the Gladiators, and is also an excellent soccer player.

Reception
 In 2014, Entertainment Weekly ranked Sunspot 32nd in their "Let's rank every X-Man ever" list.
 In 2018, CBR.com ranked Sunspot 13th in their "Age Of Apocalypse: The 30 Strongest Characters In Marvel's Coolest Alternate World" list.
 In 2018, CBR.com ranked Sunspot 12th in their "X-Force: 20 Powerful Members" list.

Other versions

Age of Apocalypse
Sunspot was in the X-Ternals with Jubilee, Strong Guy, and Gambit. Like Robin Hood, they take money from Apocalypse and give to the poor. Magneto assigns them to travel to the Shi'ar Galaxy to steal the powerful M'Kraan Crystal. Sunspot dies after absorbing too much energy in an attempt to help his teammates escape.

Days of Future Past
In an alternate version of the Days of Future Past future, a war between mutants and baseline humans, started by the latter, results in a mutant victory thanks to an alliance between Xavier's Institute and the Hellfire Club. Magma and Sunspot become the Chief Arbitrators of the Lords Cardinal, and create an idyllic state for mutants, while regular humans are left to fend for themselves. Mutants born to baseline humans are taken from their parents and those who oppose Magma and Sunspot are brainwashed by the Hellfire Club's agents.

Days of Future Now
In this reality, Sunspot is shown as the leader of the Gene Nation.

Mutant X
Sunspot is part of a murderous team of 'Marauders', which consists of Jubilee, Wolfsbane, Cannonball, and Husk.

Ultimate Marvel
The Ultimate Marvel version of Sunspot a.k.a. Roberto da Costa is an angry vigilante mutant of Brazilian descent. Originally came from Harlem in this continuity, he sees the X-Men as decadent Uncle Tom figures and has accused them of living in an ivory tower, considering themselves separate from "second-class muties" like himself. He also harbors a deep hatred for Magneto and his followers because of the anti-mutant hysteria that followed the Brooklyn Bridge's destruction at the Brotherhood of Evil Mutants's hands.

Afterward he has joined Emma Frost's Academy of Tomorrow, a school for gifted beings. Initially, Roberto is confused as he knows his grades are not impressive. Emma assures him that grades (or even mutant powers) do not always classify a person as 'gifted'. Soon after Roberto is accepted into the school, he is in trouble: fellow student Lorna Dane is framed and imprisoned for the murder of several dozen people. He is approached by Alex Summers (Polaris's boyfriend) and is convinced to help assist in breaking Lorna out. He works with Northstar and Cannonball. The team relies on Roberto's knowledge of New York City, but because Roberto had rarely been outside of Harlem, this reliance results in the team becoming lost. During this time, the X-Men attack them, and Roberto is subdued and removed from the fight.

Magneto has him killed in Ultimatum along with the rest of the Academy of Tomorrow except for Havok. Sunspot is murdered in an attack. He is buried on the grounds of the X-Mansion.

What If?
In "What if Some of the X-Men Had Stayed In Asgard?", Sunspot is one of the X-Men and New Mutants members who choose to remain in Asgard. When Hela attacks Storm due to Loki's intrigues, Sunspot rushes to aid Storm, to have his life taken away by the death goddess before he can land a blow on her.

In other media

Television
 A teenage Sunspot appears in X-Men: Evolution, voiced by Michael Coleman. This version is a member of the X-Men's junior team, the New Mutants, who lives at Xavier's School for Gifted Youngsters and displays a rivalry with Berzerker and a close bond with Wolfsbane.
 Sunspot will appear in X-Men '97.

Film

 Sunspot was originally meant to appear in X-Men: First Class, but was written out due to time and budget issues.
 Sunspot appears in X-Men: Days of Future Past, portrayed by Adan Canto. This version is a member of the X-Men from a post-apocalyptic Sentinel-dominated future.
 Sunspot appears in The New Mutants, portrayed by Henry Zaga. After accidentally burning his girlfriend, Juliana, this version developed a fear of doing the same to others before eventually overcoming it and develops a romantic interest in Illyana Rasputin.

References

External links
 Sunspot at Marvel.com
 Spotlight On Sunspot, UncannyXmen.net

Avengers (comics) characters
Brazilian superheroes
Characters created by Bob McLeod
Characters created by Chris Claremont
Comics characters introduced in 1982
Fictional Afro-Brazilian people
Fictional American people
Fictional businesspeople
Fictional characters with absorption or parasitic abilities
Fictional characters with fire or heat abilities
Fictional characters who can manipulate light
Marvel Comics American superheroes
Marvel Comics characters with superhuman strength
Marvel Comics film characters
Marvel Comics male superheroes
Marvel Comics mutants
New Mutants
S.H.I.E.L.D. agents
X-Men supporting characters